Colonel Sir Ronald Laurence Gardner-Thorpe  (13 May 1917 – 11 December 1991), was a British company director and Liberal Party politician who also became the 653rd Lord Mayor of London in 1980.

Background
Gardner-Thorpe was the son of Joseph Gardner and Hannah Coulthurst Thorpe. He was educated at St John's College, Portsmouth. In 1938 he married Hazel Mary Dees. They had one son.

Political career
Gardner-Thorpe was Liberal candidate for the Eastbourne division of Sussex at the 1959 General Election. The Liberals had not run a candidate at the previous election in 1955. He managed a respectable 18% poll, finishing third. He was joint honorary treasurer of the Liberal Party, a member of the party executive and President of the Home Counties Young Liberals.

He was Liberal candidate at the 1962 West Derbyshire by-election. The election took place at a period where the Liberal Party's fortunes were on the rise following victory in the Orpington by-election. Again, no Liberal had stood at the previous general election; despite this, he was able to poll nearly a third of the vote, push Labour into third place and come within 1,200 votes of gaining the seat from the Conservatives. He was Liberal candidate again for West Derbyshire at the 1964 General Election. However this time, the Conservatives regained some lost support and Gardner-Thorpe remained second. He did not stand for parliament again. He was elected Sheriff of London in 1978 and Lord Mayor of London in 1980. In 1980 he was knighted a Knight Grand Cross of the Order of the British Empire (GBE).

Electoral record

Honours/Awards
GBE (1980) 
KStJ (1980) 
TD (1948)
Hon DCL London (1980) 
Hon DH Lewis Chicago (1981) 
Hon FRCP (1986)

References

|-

1917 births
1991 deaths
Liberal Party (UK) parliamentary candidates
People educated at St John's College, Portsmouth
Sheriffs of the City of London
20th-century lord mayors of London
20th-century English politicians
Knights Grand Cross of the Order of the British Empire